Jimmy Young (born 1987) is a former American football wide receiver who played professionally for the Pittsburgh Steelers of the National Football League (NFL). He played college football at TCU.

College career
Young played his college football at TCU. He became the favorite target for Andy Dalton in the 2008 season, his redshirt sophomore year, catching 59 balls for a team leading 988 yards and 5 touchdowns. In his junior and senior years he was overtaken as the primary target by Jeremy Kerley, but remained productive. He played a big role in the Rose Bowl win over Wisconsin by grabbing 5 balls for 57 yards, converting multiple first downs. Young is a member of Kappa Alpha Psi fraternity.

NFL career

Chicago Bears
Young went undrafted in the 2011 NFL draft. He signed with the Chicago Bears as an undrafted free agent hours after the draft. He was released as a final cut and remained a free agent for the rest of the 2011 season.

Pittsburgh Steelers
On January 3, 2012, the Pittsburgh Steelers agreed to sign Young.

References

1987 births
Living people
American football wide receivers
Pittsburgh Steelers players
TCU Horned Frogs football players
Sportspeople from Monroe, Louisiana
Players of American football from Louisiana